Mighty Ducks (also known as Mighty Ducks: The Animated Series) is an American animated television series that aired on ABC and the syndicated programming block The Disney Afternoon, the last show produced by the block, in the fall of 1996. The show was loosely inspired by the live-action Mighty Ducks films and the NHL team, the Anaheim Ducks. Unlike the films and the hockey team, the show was about a team of anthropomorphic hockey-playing ducks.

Twenty-six episodes were produced in total. The series most recently aired on Toon Disney but was removed from its schedule in November 2004. The series has been available on the streaming service Disney+ since its launch in November 2019.

The series' main theme, composed by Patrick DeRemer, is performed by Starship vocalist Mickey Thomas.

Story
In another universe exists a planet populated entirely by humanoid ducks. Dubbed "Puckworld" by its inhabitants, it is an icy planet, perfectly suited to the Ducks' favorite pastime, hockey. For the citizens of Puckworld, hockey was not simply a sport, but a way of life, occupying virtually every aspect of day-to-day existence.

Legend has it that centuries ago, during an invasion by a reptilian race called Saurians, a duck named Drake DuCaine became the planet's savior over the Saurians' Overlords. The legend tells that DuCaine did so with a high-tech goalie  mask which gave him the ability to see through the Saurians' cloaking technology which was a game changer for him and his people. With it, DuCaine sent the Saurians to a mysterious "Dimensional Limbo".

The last of the Saurians escape from the Dimensional Limbo and returns to Puckworld with an armada of robotic attack ships. The group of four is led by the last of the Saurian Overlords, Lord Dragaunus, who is assisted by his minions Siege, Chameleon and Wraith. They invade the planet and enslave the people of Puckworld. After some time, a resistance is formed by Canard Thunderbeak, who has found The Mask of Drake DuCaine. With it, the wearer of the Mask could see through the Saurians' invisibility cloaks. Canard forms a band of Ducks to fight Dragaunus. The members of his team consists of Wildwing Flashblade, Nosedive Flashblade, Tanya Vanderflock, Duke L'Orange, Mallory McMallard and Grin Hardwing. They go on a mission to destroy Dragaunus's fortress the Master Tower and free the planet from the Saurians' control. While the mission is successful, Dragaunus and his forces manage to escape in their ship, the Raptor. The Saurians open up a dimensional gateway to escape through, but Canard and the others follow him into the portal with the Aerowing, intent on stopping them.

Dragaunus attempts to get rid of the Ducks inside the portal by attacking them with an electromagnetic worm that will grow until it can swallow the Aerowing. In a desperate attempt to get rid of the worm, Canard sacrifices his own life by throwing himself to the worm. Before doing so, however, Canard gave the Mask, and leadership of the team, to Wildwing Flashblade, his best friend. Both the Raptor and the Aerowing leave the portal and enter a different dimension, landing in the Earth city of Anaheim, California. The Ducks meet Phil Palmfeather, a human who becomes their manager and makes them a legitimate NHL team. Their arena, only known as The Pond in the show, has a hockey rink that doubles as a landing pad for the Aerowing above and has a formal HQ below. On Earth, the Ducks and Dragaunus continue their fight, with Dragaunus's plans of conquest often curtailed by damage to the Raptor's power source and his efforts to find a new source of power, although there are other villains that also challenge the six Ducks.

Characters

Main

 Wildwing Flashblade (voiced by Ian Ziering)Saved by Canard back on Puckworld, he is the leader of the Ducks on and off the ice. At first reluctant to take charge after Canard fell, he eventually comes to accept the role of leadership. As a hockey player, he is the team's goaltender, wearing the jersey number 00 and being known for his ability to take any kind of beating and still remain standing. Brave like Canard before him, Wildwing is also intelligent and just. He usually plays the straight man to the other ducks and protector to his younger brother, Nosedive. Along with the mask of Drake DuCaine, Wildwing uses body armor and a Puck Launcher on his left gauntlet. The character is based on Wild Wing, the mascot of the Anaheim Ducks since their debut in 1993. Unlike the animated character, the real Wild Wing wears the jersey number 00
 Nosedive Flashblade (voiced by Steve Mackall) is Wildwing's younger brother, who initially was not intended to be part of Canard's resistance. However, Wildwing makes Canard take Nosedive with them by quoting "If you want me, then my brother's part of the deal." Once they reach Earth, Nosedive becomes an official member of the team, both on the hockey team and the crime fighting team. He is by far the team's most impulsive and immature member. Nosedive is more childish and easy-going than the other Ducks, and often looks toward his older brother for support and protection. Nosedive can be very likable, making friends with teammate Grin, and humans Thrash and Mookie. He wears body armor, but not as much as Wildwing. He usually uses a Puck Blaster and rides a Duckcycle. On-ice, Nosedive is the left winger, and his jersey number is 33.
 Duke L'Orange (voiced by Jeff Bennett) is a notorious jewel thief on Puckworld,  he was originally a father of his 2 children a boy named James L'Orange and a girl named Delilah L'Orange, Duke changed his ways to battle Lord Dragaunus and aid the people of Puckworld. Duke has used a Puck Blaster in some episodes, but he mainly uses a golden sword called a Ducksaber (or sometimes just a 'saber'). He also carries lock picks and a grappling hook attached to his wrist. Duke is pretty level-headed, albeit egotistical at times. He also has an eyepatch and a chipped beak, possibly as a result of his past as a thief (In the episode "Dungeons and Ducks", he tells Borg, "Hey, take it easy, you can put someone's eye out with one of that thing [a sword]. I should know.", which might be a clue to how he lost his eye). He was the leader of a gang called The Brotherhood of the Blade. He remains the most experienced of all the Ducks and possesses a good balance of skill and confidence. Unfortunately, there are some minor trust issues with Mallory due to Duke being an ex-thief, though this fact doesn't seem to faze their leader Wildwing. His name is a pun on the dish duck à l'orange. He is the team's center, and his jersey number is 13. He is charming 
 Mallory McMallard (voiced by Jennifer Hale) is a fiery redhead who is well-learned in Puckworld's version of the martial arts, although most of the time she is content with just using a Puck Blaster. She has a sharp tongue and usually directs it towards Nosedive's immature acts, or anything that she feels is "out of line." Her trust is easily broken, particularly in Duke's case, and as she sees it, for some very good reasons. With her strong military background as a member of the "Puckworld Special Forces," she often thinks in black and white. She's a strict disciplinarian, and has a high regard for the chain of command. She's also stubborn, which can be a fault as much as a strength. Mallory is the team's right winger, and her jersey number is 15.
 Tanya Vanderflock (voiced by April Winchell) is the Ducks' resident genius who is often the one turned to for advice, even by Wildwing. She is good with mechanics and uses the Omnitool on her wrist with many of her projects. Despite her intellect, she has bad allergies (including an ironic allergy to feathers, with the result that she constantly sounds like she has a cold), lacks confidence, has a gentler personality, and is not as good a fighter as the other ducks. She makes up for this with her good common sense and wry humor. According to herself, her middle name is Gertrude. On-ice, Tanya is the left defenseman, and her jersey number is 23.
 Check "Grin" Hardwing (voiced by Brad Garrett as an adult, J.D. Daniels as a kid, S. Scott Bullock as a teenager) is a large super-strong member of the group with a Zen-like philosophy. Unlike the stereotype of strong people, Grin is wise and doesn't let his anger cloud his judgment. He rarely uses weapons in battle, relying on his wisdom and strength instead. He has a strong sense of honor and can always be counted on for support. He is a good friend of Nosedive. During Grin's younger years, he had a horrible temper. He found enlightenment with the training from the grand hockey master, Tai Quack Do. Grin is the right defenseman of the team, and his jersey number is 1, the same number on Tai Quack Do wears on his robe.

Allies
 Canard Thunderbeak (voiced by Townsend Coleman) was Wildwing's best friend, and the only remaining survivor of the Resistance from Puckworld. He was the original leader and team captain of the Mighty Ducks. While following Dragaunus through a dimensional gateway, Canard sacrificed himself when the Saurians released an electromagnetic worm on the Aerowing. Before he did, he gave the mask of Drake DuCaine to Wildwing and told him to be the team captain as he gets trapped in the dimensional limbo. As far as the Mighty Ducks know, Canard is still trapped in dimensional limbo. He was a great leader and a great friend. Wildwing believes Canard is still alive and swears he will find him. In the episode "Take Me to Your Leader", he appears to have escaped and made a distress call to the Ducks, but it is revealed to be Chameleon setting a trap for them once again leaving Wildwing feeling guilty for not being able to save his friend. As Wildwing thinks he still might be alive in the dimensional limbo, he vows to one day find him.
 Phil Palmfeather (voiced by Jim Belushi) is the Ducks' manager when they are being an ice hockey team. Phil would rather have the team do dangerous or stupid promotional gimmicks and autograph signings with fans than having them save the world over hero work sometimes, although he does acknowledge that they do good. He also has bad taste in fashion.
 Captain Klegghorn (voiced by Dennis Franz)Head commissioner & captain of the Anaheim Police Department who initially doesn't trust the Ducks, particularly due to the lack of evidence that Dragaunus even existed in the first place. While he still doesn't like them, eventually they come to terms when he helped Wildwing retake the Pond when the Saurians took their headquarters.
 Thrash (voiced by Jeff Bennett) & Mookie (voiced by April Winchell) are Nosedive's seemingly only human friends who dress like punk rockers. They run the comics store called "Captain Comics," of which Nosedive is a frequent customer. They were the first people that they met on Earth. Thrash is male, Mookie is female.
 Bernie "Buzz" Blitzman (voiced by Jeff Bennett) is a young orphan and boy genius in his early teens. He is a big fan of the Ducks and is particularly fond of Mallory. He proves to be a big help to the Ducks.
 Dr. Huggerman (voiced by Efrem Zimbalist Jr.) is a scientist and friend of Tanya's. He turned his back on humanity when they abused his inventions. However, he does help the Ducks stop the energy creatures.
 Borg (voiced by Rob Paulsen)Prince regent of a different dimensional Anaheim. The Ducks helped him take back his throne and fought against the evil wizard Asteroth. He soon returns to warn the Ducks of Asteroth's search for his amulet (which the Ducks had taken back to their dimension as a souvenir), and he helps Nosedive and Duke find the Star Sword, a weapon capable of destroying Asteroth's amulet.
 B.R.A.W.N. (voiced by Frank Welker) is a large intergalactic robotic bounty hunter, sent to capture Dragaunus and return him to his Dimensional Limbo prison cell but was reprogrammed to eliminate the Ducks. Tanya was able to re-reprogram him into joining their cause and stopping Dragaunus' assault platform. He from there on in had a game show host-like voice and personality. Almost his entire body was destroyed, but his head still remained. He briefly appears in "The Return of Asteroth", which revealed that his head was kept among their various trophies of past missions. His acronym stands for Bounty Robotic Assault and Weapons Negotiator. His kind guards the Dimensional Limbo prison.
 Baby (vocals by Frank Welker) is the name given to a young alien adopted by Nosedive. For a while it goes on a rampage, but thanks to Nosedive it ends up being an ally to the Ducks, helps them stop their enemies, and they have him go back to his normal state.
 Prince V’Lara (voiced by Jeff Bennett) is a former Atlantean prisoner turned ally of Wildwing years before the series.
 Stanley Strazinski (voiced by Jim Cummings) is a former hockey player with a violent attitude. Dragaunus came to him for help and used a DNA accelerator to transform him into a monstrous version of himself to fight the ducks. Stanley changed his ways when Grin's words reached him. He was turned back to normal and becomes a referee.

Villains
 The Saurians are a race of reptilian humanoids and the primary antagonists.
 Lord Dragaunus (voiced by Tim Curry) is the Dragon-like leader of the Saurians and the last of the Saurian Overlords. Dragaunus is evil, big, strong and can breathe fire. He's not above working with humans or even other aliens he hates in his quest for world domination. When a geeky guy who's a comic book fan dreams of being a real-life superhero, he gives him superpowers and employs him to steal and kill others for Dragaunus. He doesn't take kindly to the failures of his cronies, Siege, Chameleon and Wraith. Dragaunus has lost faith in the Saurian dark magic which Wraith uses and only when somewhat desperate, will he allow Wraith to employ them in a major part of his latest plan. Otherwise, the main tools he equips himself and his henchmen with are teleporters, rays, blasters, rockets, and cloaking devices. Most of Dragaunus's schemes involve trying to create an alternative fuel source for his flagship, The Raptor, after Grin and Tanya smashed its existing power crystals in the pilot, with the Raptor's remaining power only enough to run the ship's cloaking device wherever it lands.
 Wraith (voiced by Tony Jay) is a Wyvern-like Sorcerer with a dry sense of humor. He is smarter than Siege or Chameleon and serves as Dragaunus' second-in-command, but disdained by Dragaunus because of his firm belief that the dark magic of their ancestors is the only means for victory. Wraith shuns weapons in battle, preferring to use his ability to throw fireballs. He is very glum and is often predicting the inevitable failure of their mission. Of course, Wraith is usually proven right.
 Siege (voiced by Clancy Brown) is an Ankylosaurus-like soldier who is aggressive and has a strong hatred for the Ducks (particularly Grin, due to the large duck being able to go toe-to-toe with him on a daily basis and generally win or draw in the fight). He can also be viewed as Dragaunus' military advisor and weapons expert, though the window is pretty wide. His cruel nature is mechanically and technologically minded, and he believes that brute force is the only means of victory. He often builds weapons and vehicles and directly uses them against the Ducks. He scoffs the dark magic of the ancient Saurians, and Dragaunus seems a little more tolerant and open to his ideas as a result. However, when he fails, he gets little better treatment than the others.
 Chameleon (voiced by Frank Welker) is a shapeshifting Chameleon-like Saurian that is able to increase or decrease his strength, size and dexterity depending on his transformations. Much of the time, an imperfect transformation can give him away. Also, he ends up wasting his powers a lot by doing corny impressions of human celebrities (mostly famous early 20th century comedians). At times, he is capable of transforming into a large reptilian form rivaling Siege or Grin in strength. Dragaunus has little patience for his antics and stupidity. The most effective uses of his powers has been in his impersonations of the Ducks and other humans, which comes in handy the most for such tasks as infiltration, sabotage, and espionage.
 The Hunter Drones are robotic foot soldiers of Dragaunus. They have blasters on their hands. They are often easily destroyed by the Ducks. Dragaunus himself destroys them whenever he's extremely angry and having a tantrum.
 TinyIn "The Iced Ducks Cometh", the Ducks face off against a much larger Drone, nicknamed Tiny by Siege. However, Nosedive destroys Tiny by crushing him with a zamboni.
 Dr. Droid (voiced by Charlie Adler)Formerly a human named Otto Maton, Dr. Droid is now a cyborg, and wants to turn the rest of the world into robots. The Ducks tangle with him twice.
 Trina (voiced by Tress MacNeille) is a machine disguised as a typical woman who served Dr. Droid as his right-hand woman.
 Trina II (voiced by MacNeille) is a duplicate of Trina.
 J76412 (voiced by Jim Cummings) is a computer system that helps Dr. Droid take control over all the machines in Anaheim.
 The Devastator Robots are an army of robots that Dr. Droid creates. He enlarges one of them and it goes out attacking Mallory and Wildwing. 
 Asteroth (voiced by W. Morgan Sheppard) is an evil wizard from another dimension which is actually a supernatural version of Anaheim, California. His title is "Lord of the Red Dragon", since he can morph into a large red dragon when enough power is in his possession. The Ducks fight him twice: first in the alternate Anaheim and then in the "real" Anaheim. It is possible that he could be the most powerful villain of the show.
 Balthar (voiced by John Kassir) is a homunculus who is Asteroth's right hand minion.
 The Undead Warriors are Asteroth's army of skeletons.
 The Golems are clay creatures created by Asteroth.
 Phineas P. Viper (voiced by Xander Berkeley) is an industrialist who helped Dragaunus with his plan to create a Super Raptor. In the future, he ruled Earth with an iron fist while the Saurians were off conquering the galaxy and he genetically merged himself with his pet snakes in that time. He was mentioned again in "Bringing Down Baby" when Wildwing, Duke and Tanya found out that he was still helping Dragaunus with his plans.
 Boopsie is Viper's giant snake pet.
 Daddy-O Cool (voiced by Jim Cummings) is a deformed beat poet who is into monster trucks. In "Monster Rally", he challenged the ducks to a monster truck battle, and had planned to put toxic waste into the world's water supply to make the world a "cooler" place. It's stated that he was once human, until he fell into some toxic waste. When his plan is thwarted, the toxic waste changes him into a 1950s insurance salesman. His men are Digger and Dragster.
 Digger (voiced by Charlie Adler) is one of Daddy-O Cool's minions.
 Dragster (voiced by Jeff Bennett) is another one of Daddy-O Cool's minions alongside Digger.
 Dr. Wallace "Wally" Pretorious (voiced by Matt Frewer) is a mad scientist who likes to splice different types of DNA on test subjects. His main purpose was to try his experiment out on the Ducks by trapping them in a small town called Sunnyville, where he disguised himself as the town mechanic. He then kidnapped the town residents and made humanoid replicas of them, after he made a satellite that jammed their frequencies forcing their vehicle to break down and prevented them from using their comlinks. He was about to extract their DNA until Nosedive saved them. He is also considered Dragaunus' number 1 fan.
 The Chicken Monster is a spliced creature created by Dr. Wally Pretorious.
 Falcone (voiced by Reed Diamond) is a Raptrin member of The Brotherhood of The Blade. Duke pretended to join up with Falcone to learn what he was up to, and found out that Falcone was working for the Saurians, trying to help them steal the world's largest jewels for a new weapon. Duke tried to stop him, but failed as Falcone got him arrested. Falcone got the gem, but not long after that, his ship blew up and sent him down into a moat. There, the guards of Big Ben found him and arrested him.
 Lucretia DeCoy (voiced by Kath Soucie) is a traitor to the race of the Ducks and a spy for the Saurians. Tanya was the only one who knew who she was, but Lucretia prevented her from revealing that she was a spy by tying her to the top rafters of The Pond. She tells the others that her name is "Vonda McDrake". Due to a misunderstanding, the Saurians believed that she switched the item she was sent to steal from a tomb with the help from the Ducks; it had really been switched by Wildwing. The end result was her being sent to the dimensional limbo as punishment for her perceived treachery. Dragaunus tried to use the chip as a weapon, and it blew up in his face. She was also responsible for almost wiping out the Resistance back on Puckworld.
 Dr. Swindle (voiced by Rob Paulsen) is a corrupt scientist the Saurians hired in "Beaks vs. B.R.A.W.N." to create a flotation device. When the Saurians refused to pay him for his work, he attempted to sell the machine to the highest bidder instead. The highest bidder turned out to be Chameleon, who took the device and left Swindle with a suitcase full of newspapers. A running gag has the Doctor insisting that his name is pronounced "Swindel".
 Baron Von Licktenstamp (voiced by David Hyde Pierce) is a German hunter who owned his own island. He captures Wildwing, Tanya and Duke and hunts them. Baron Von Licktenstamp had robotic animals to help with his hunt. He collaborated with Dragaunus, giving him the Solaranite substance in exchange for the hunt. Baron Von Licktenstamp was captured by the three ducks and had his head stuck on a wall.
 Mondo-Man (voiced by Eddie Deezen & Jeff Bennett)Alvin Yasbeck is a regular customer of Captain Comics who did not like the Ducks' style of crimefighting, so he acted like he was his own superhero. However, he was extremely clumsy at what he did, and his appearance gave the Saurians the chance to escape once more. Tricking him into believing they were good and the Ducks were evil, Dragaunus gave him super powers and got him to do his dirty work. Incapacitating three of the Ducks with "Ducktonite", a radioactive egg of his own creation which had the ability to weaken them, he then stole some Balerium Crystals from the incoming Sarks for the Saurians. After Dragaunus was finished with him, he took away his powers during a fight and he was later arrested by Captain Klegghorn.
 Emperor Charg (voiced by Jim Cummings) is an unscrupulous alien ruler who oversees Space Hockey, a tournament where those who lose or fail to participate are disintegrated.
 'Weasel (voiced by Frank Welker) is Emperor Charg's minion who captures the Ducks to take them to Hockeydome where Space Hockey is held. 
 Emperor Xyloid & Commander Xenon (both voiced by Jim Cummings) are Abominable Snowman-like aliens that came to Earth to freeze the entire planet to live on with the aid of their weather machine, which was interfering with Dragaunus' plan to use solar power to recharge the Raptor. During conversation, Xyloid always tells everyone to take a memo/note, tells them what he has to say, and he ends his sentences with "Sincerely, Yours truly, so on and so forth, etc., etc., etc."
 Zap (voiced by Frank Welker) is an energy creature created by Dragaunus. It ends ups doing the Ducks a favor as they have it teleported to Dragaunus's ship and wrecks it.
 Minotaur (voiced by Frank Welker) is a huge monster that guards the star sword.
 Lord Gargan (voiced by Jonathan Harris) is an Atlantean who collaborated with Chameleon to take over Atlantis.

Episodes

Home media
A direct-to-video feature film titled Mighty Ducks the Movie: The First Face-Off was released on VHS on April 8, 1997. It comprises three episodes of the series ("The First Face-Off" Parts 1 and 2, and "Duck Hard") edited into one continuous movie. The movie is one of numerous produced since 1969 where the director chose to be credited under the Alan Smithee pseudonym.

Awards and nominations
 Daytime Emmy Awards
1997 – Outstanding Sound Editing – Special Class – Paca Thomas, Nick Carr, Marc S. Perlman, Kris Daly, Melissa Ellis, Phyllis Ginter, Eric Hertsguaard, Paul Holzborn, Jennifer Mertens, William Griggs, Jeff Hutchins, Kenneth Young, Bill Kean, David Lynch, and Otis Van Osten (won)

See also

 List of anthropomorphic animal superheroes

References

External links
 Mighty Ducks: The Animated Series  Official Website
 
 

1990s American animated television series
1990s American comic science fiction television series
1996 American television series debuts
1997 American television series endings
American Broadcasting Company original programming
American children's animated action television series
American children's animated comic science fiction television series
American children's animated space adventure television series
American children's animated science fantasy television series
American children's animated sports television series
American children's animated superhero television series
Animated television series about extraterrestrial life
English-language television shows
Animal superheroes
Disney Channel original programming
YTV (Canadian TV channel) original programming
First-run syndicated television programs in the United States
Animated television shows based on films
Television series based on Disney films
Television series by Disney Television Animation
Television shows set in Orange County, California
The Disney Afternoon
The Mighty Ducks
Ice hockey television series
Television series set on fictional planets
Television series about outer space
Animated television series about ducks